Gabriel Georgiades (born January 18, 1957) is a Professor of Aerospace Engineering in the Department of Aerospace Engineering at California State Polytechnic University, Pomona. He is a widely published author known throughout the world as one of the leading authorities on light aircraft spin tendencies and recovery along with a major contributor to the creation of the finite element method of analyzing aircraft structures.

Education
Professor Gabriel Georgiades obtained a B.A. from Jacksonville University in 1979 along with a B.A.E. from the Georgia Institute of Technology in 1979.

Career
After working in industry for a number of years at notable aviation companies such as Piper Aircraft, Georgiades pursued an M.S. from Pennsylvania State University in aerospace engineering, graduating in 1982. From 1985 onward Georgiades has been an active full-time professor at California State Polytechnic University, Pomona, teaching courses in structures and Finite element method. Gabriel Georgiades is an elected national fellow of the American Institute of Aeronautics and Astronautics. Gabriel has held elected AIAA offices such as regional chair, chair-elect, VC of education and advisory committee representative and was the former "Evolution of Flight" program officer for the San Gabriel Valley Region AIAA.

References

External links
Aerospace Engineering page at Cal Poly Pomona

1947 births
Living people
American aerospace engineers
Georgia Tech alumni
Jacksonville University alumni
Penn State College of Engineering alumni